Anatolia, also known as Asia Minor, is a large peninsula in Western Asia and is the western-most extension of continental Asia. The land mass of Anatolia constitutes most of the territory of contemporary Turkey. Geographically, the Anatolian region is bounded by the Turkish Straits to the north-west, the Black Sea to the north, the Armenian Highlands to the east, the Mediterranean Sea to the south, and the Aegean Sea to the west. Topographically, the Sea of Marmara connects the Black Sea with the Aegean Sea through the Bosporus strait and the Dardanelles strait, and separates Anatolia from Thrace in the Balkan peninsula of Southeastern Europe.

The eastern border of Anatolia is a line between the Gulf of Alexandretta and the Black Sea, bounded by the Armenian Highlands to the east and Mesopotamia to the south-east, thus Anatolia comprises approximately the western two-thirds of the Asian territory of Turkey. Anatolia sometimes is synonymous with Asian Turkey, thereby including the western part of the Armenian Highlands and northern Mesopotamia and making its eastern and southern borders coterminous with Turkey's borders.

The ancient Anatolian peoples spoke the now-extinct Anatolian languages of the Indo-European language family, which were largely replaced by the Greek language during Classical antiquity as well as during the Hellenistic, Roman, and Byzantine periods. The major Anatolian languages included Hittite, Luwian, and Lydian, while other, poorly attested local languages included Phrygian and Mysian. Hurro-Urartian languages were spoken in the southeastern kingdom of Mitanni, while Galatian, a Celtic language, was spoken in Galatia, central Anatolia. The Turkification of Anatolia began under the rule of the Seljuk Empire in the late 11th century, continued under the Ottoman Empire between the late 13th and early 20th centuries, and continues today under the Republic of Turkey. However, various non-Turkic languages continue to be spoken by minorities in Anatolia today, including Kurdish, Neo-Aramaic, Armenian, North Caucasian languages, Laz, Georgian, and Greek. Other ancient peoples in the region included Galatians, Hurrians, Assyrians, Hattians, Cimmerians, as well as Ionian, Dorian, and Aeolic Greeks.

Geography

Traditionally, Anatolia is considered to extend in the east to an indefinite line running from the Gulf of Alexandretta to the Black Sea, coterminous with the Anatolian Plateau. This traditional geographical definition is used, for example, in the latest edition of Merriam-Webster's Geographical Dictionary. Under this definition, Anatolia is bounded to the east by the Armenian Highlands, and the Euphrates before that river bends to the southeast to enter Mesopotamia. To the southeast, it is bounded by the ranges that separate it from the Orontes valley in Syria and the Mesopotamian plain.

Following the Armenian genocide, Western Armenia was renamed the Eastern Anatolia Region by the newly established Turkish government. In 1941, with the First Geography Congress which divided Turkey into seven geographical regions based on differences in climate and landscape, the eastern provinces of Turkey were placed into the Eastern Anatolia Region, which largely corresponds to the historical region of Western Armenia (named as such after the division of Greater Armenia between the Roman/Byzantine Empire (Western Armenia) and Sassanid Persia (Eastern Armenia) in 387 AD). Vazken Davidian terms the expanded use of "Anatolia" to apply to territory in eastern Turkey that was formerly referred to as Armenia (which had a sizeable Armenian population before the Armenian genocide) an "ahistorical imposition" and notes that a growing body of literature is uncomfortable with referring to the Ottoman East as "Eastern Anatolia".

The highest mountain in the Eastern Anatolia Region (also the highest peak in the Armenian Highlands) is Mount Ararat (5123 m). The Euphrates, Araxes, Karasu and Murat rivers connect the Armenian Highlands to the South Caucasus and the Upper Euphrates Valley. Along with the Çoruh, these rivers are the longest in the Eastern Anatolia Region.

Etymology 
The English-language name Anatolia derives from the Greek  meaning "the East" and designating (from a Greek point of view) eastern regions in general. The Greek word refers to the direction where the sun rises, coming from  anatello '(Ι) rise up', comparable to terms in other languages such as "levant" from Latin  'to rise', "orient" from Latin  'to arise, to originate', Hebrew  mizraḥ 'east' from  zaraḥ 'to rise, to shine', Aramaic  midnaḥ from  denaḥ 'to rise, to shine'.

The use of Anatolian designations has varied over time, perhaps originally referring to the Aeolian, Ionian and Dorian colonies situated along the eastern coasts of the Aegean Sea, but also encompassing eastern regions in general. Such use of Anatolian designations was employed during the reign of Roman Emperor Diocletian, who created the Diocese of the East, known in Greek as the Eastern Diocese, but completely unrelated to the regions of Asia Minor. In their widest territorial scope, Anatolian designations were employed during the reign of Roman Emperor Constantine I (306–337), who created the Praetorian prefecture of the East, known in Greek as the Eastern Prefecture, encompassing all eastern regions of the Late Roman Empire and spanning from Thrace to Egypt.

Only after the loss of other eastern regions during the 7th century and the reduction of Byzantine eastern domains to Asia Minor, that region became the only remaining part of the Byzantine East, and thus commonly referred to (in Greek) as the Eastern part of the Empire. At the same time, the Anatolic Theme ( / "the Eastern theme") was created, as a province (theme) covering the western and central parts of Turkey's present-day Central Anatolia Region, centered around Iconium, but ruled from the city of Amorium.

The Latinized form "", with its -ia ending, is probably a Medieval Latin innovation. The modern Turkish form  derives directly from the Greek name  (Anatolḗ). The Russian male name Anatoly, the French Anatole and plain Anatol, all stemming from saints Anatolius of Laodicea (d. 283) and Anatolius of Constantinople (d. 458; the first Patriarch of Constantinople), share the same linguistic origin.

Names 

The oldest known name for any region within Anatolia is related to its central area, known as the "Land of Hatti" – a designation that was initially used for the land of ancient Hattians, but later became the most common name for the entire territory under the rule of ancient Hittites.

The first recorded name the Greeks used for the Anatolian peninsula, though not particularly popular at the time, was Ἀσία (Asía), perhaps from an Akkadian expression for the "sunrise" or possibly echoing the name of the Assuwa league in western Anatolia. The Romans used it as the name of their province, comprising the west of the peninsula plus the nearby Aegean Islands. As the name "Asia" broadened its scope to apply to the vaster region east of the Mediterranean, some Greeks in Late Antiquity came to use the name Asia Minor (Μικρὰ Ἀσία, Mikrà Asía), meaning "Lesser Asia" to refer to present-day Anatolia, whereas the administration of the Empire preferred the description Ἀνατολή (Anatolḗ "the East").

The endonym Ῥωμανία (Rōmanía "the land of the Romans, i.e. the Eastern Roman Empire") was understood as another name for the province by the invading Seljuq Turks, who founded a Sultanate of Rûm in 1077. Thus (land of the) Rûm became another name for Anatolia. By the 12th century Europeans had started referring to Anatolia as Turchia.

During the era of the Ottoman Empire, mapmakers outside the Empire referred to the mountainous plateau in eastern Anatolia as Armenia. Other contemporary sources called the same area Kurdistan. Geographers have variously used the terms East Anatolian Plateau and Armenian Plateau to refer to the region, although the territory encompassed by each term largely overlaps with the other. According to archaeologist Lori Khatchadourian, this difference in terminology "primarily result[s] from the shifting political fortunes and cultural trajectories of the region since the nineteenth century".

Turkey's First Geography Congress in 1941 created two geographical regions of Turkey to the east of the Gulf of Iskenderun-Black Sea line, the Eastern Anatolia Region and the Southeastern Anatolia Region, the former largely corresponding to the western part of the Armenian Highlands, the latter to the northern part of the Mesopotamian plain. According to Richard Hovannisian, this changing of toponyms was "necessary to obscure all evidence" of the Armenian presence as part of the policy of Armenian genocide denial embarked upon by the newly established Turkish government and what Hovannisian calls its "foreign collaborators".

History

Prehistoric Anatolia

Human habitation in Anatolia dates back to the Paleolithic. Neolithic settlements include Çatalhöyük, Çayönü, Nevali Cori, Aşıklı Höyük, Boncuklu Höyük Hacilar, Göbekli Tepe, Norşuntepe, Kosk, and Mersin. Çatalhöyük (7.000 BCE) is considered the most advanced of these. Neolithic Anatolia has been proposed as the homeland of the Indo-European language family, although linguists tend to favour a later origin in the steppes north of the Black Sea. However, it is clear that the Anatolian languages, the earliest attested branch of Indo-European, have been spoken in Anatolia since at least the 19th century BCE.

Recent advances in archaeogenetics have confirmed that the spread of agriculture from the Middle East to Europe was strongly correlated with the migration of early farmers from Anatolia about 9,000 years ago, and was not just a cultural exchange. Anatolian Neolithic farmers derived a significant portion of their ancestry from the Anatolian hunter-gatherers, suggesting that agriculture was adopted in site by these hunter-gatherers and not spread by demic diffusion into the region.

Ancient Anatolia

The earliest historical data related to Anatolia appear during the Bronze Age and continue throughout the Iron Age. The most ancient period in the history of Anatolia spans from the emergence of ancient Hattians, up to the conquest of Anatolia by the Achaemenid Empire in the 6th century BCE.

Hattians and Hurrians

The earliest historically attested populations of Anatolia were the Hattians in central Anatolia, and Hurrians further to the east. The Hattians were an indigenous people, whose main center was the city of Hattush. Affiliation of Hattian language remains unclear, while Hurrian language belongs to a distinctive family of Hurro-Urartian languages. All of those languages are extinct; relationships with indigenous languages of the Caucasus have been proposed, but are not generally accepted. The region became famous for exporting raw materials. Organized trade between Anatolia and Mesopotamia started to emerge during the period of the Akkadian Empire, and was continued and intensified during the period of the Old Assyrian Empire, between the 21st and the 18th centuries BCE. Assyrian traders were bringing tin and textiles in exchange for copper, silver or gold. Cuneiform records, dated circa 20th century BCE, found in Anatolia at the Assyrian colony of Kanesh, use an advanced system of trading computations and credit lines.

Hittite Anatolia (18th–12th century BCE)

Unlike the Akkadians and Assyrians, whose Anatolian trading posts were peripheral to their core lands in Mesopotamia, the Hittites were centered at Hattusa (modern Boğazkale) in north-central Anatolia by the 17th century BCE. They were speakers of an Indo-European language, the Hittite language, or nesili (the language of Nesa) in Hittite. The Hittites originated from local ancient cultures that grew in Anatolia, in addition to the arrival of Indo-European languages. Attested for the first time in the Assyrian tablets of Nesa around 2000 BCE, they conquered Hattusa in the 18th century BCE, imposing themselves over Hattian- and Hurrian-speaking populations. According to the widely accepted Kurgan theory on the Proto-Indo-European homeland, however, the Hittites (along with the other Indo-European ancient Anatolians) were themselves relatively recent immigrants to Anatolia from the north. However, they did not necessarily displace the population genetically; they assimilated into the former peoples' culture, preserving the Hittite language.

The Hittites adopted the Mesopotamian cuneiform script. In the Late Bronze Age, Hittite New Kingdom was founded, becoming an empire in the 14th century BCE after the conquest of Kizzuwatna in the south-east and the defeat of the Assuwa league in western Anatolia. The empire reached its height in the 13th century BCE, controlling much of Asia Minor, northwestern Syria, and northwest upper Mesopotamia. However, the Hittite advance toward the Black Sea coast was halted by the semi-nomadic pastoralist and tribal Kaskians, a non-Indo-European people who had earlier displaced the Palaic-speaking Indo-Europeans. Much of the history of the Hittite Empire concerned war with the rival empires of Egypt, Assyria and the Mitanni.

The Ancient Egyptians eventually withdrew from the region after failing to gain the upper hand over the Hittites and becoming wary of the power of Assyria, which had destroyed the Mitanni Empire. The Assyrians and Hittites were then left to battle over control of eastern and southern Anatolia and colonial territories in Syria. The Assyrians had better success than the Egyptians, annexing much Hittite (and Hurrian) territory in these regions.

Post-Hittite Anatolia (12th–6th century BCE)

After 1180 BCE, during the Late Bronze Age collapse, the Hittite Empire disintegrated into several independent Syro-Hittite states, subsequent to losing much territory to the Middle Assyrian Empire and being finally overrun by the Phrygians, another Indo-European people who are believed to have migrated from the Balkans. The Phrygian expansion into southeast Anatolia was eventually halted by the Assyrians, who controlled that region.

Luwians
Another Indo-European people, the Luwians, rose to prominence in central and western Anatolia  BCE. Their language belonged to the same linguistic branch as Hittite. The general consensus amongst scholars is that Luwian was spoken across a large area of western Anatolia, including (possibly) Wilusa (Troy), the Seha River Land (to be identified with the Hermos and/or Kaikos valley), and the kingdom of Mira-Kuwaliya with its core territory of the Maeander valley. From the 9th century BCE, Luwian regions coalesced into a number of states such as Lydia, Caria, and Lycia, all of which had Hellenic influence.

Arameans
Arameans encroached over the borders of south-central Anatolia in the century or so after the fall of the Hittite empire, and some of the Syro-Hittite states in this region became an amalgam of Hittites and Arameans. These became known as Syro-Hittite states.

Neo-Assyrian Empire

From the 10th to late 7th centuries BCE, much of Anatolia (particularly the southeastern regions) fell to the Neo-Assyrian Empire, including all of the Syro-Hittite states, Tabal, Kingdom of Commagene, the Cimmerians and Scythians, and swathes of Cappadocia.

The Neo-Assyrian empire collapsed due to a bitter series of civil wars followed by a combined attack by Medes, Persians, Scythians and their own Babylonian relations. The last Assyrian city to fall was Harran in southeast Anatolia. This city was the birthplace of the last king of Babylon, the Assyrian Nabonidus and his son and regent Belshazzar. Much of the region then fell to the short-lived Iran-based Median Empire, with the Babylonians and Scythians briefly appropriating some territory.

Cimmerian and Scythian invasions
From the late 8th century BCE, a new wave of Indo-European-speaking raiders entered northern and northeast Anatolia: the Cimmerians and Scythians. The Cimmerians overran Phrygia and the Scythians threatened to do the same to Urartu and Lydia, before both were finally checked by the Assyrians.

Early Greek presence

The north-western coast of Anatolia was inhabited by Greeks of the Achaean/Mycenaean culture from the 20th century BCE, related to the Greeks of southeastern Europe and the Aegean. Beginning with the Bronze Age collapse at the end of the 2nd millennium BCE, the west coast of Anatolia was settled by Ionian Greeks, usurping the area of the related but earlier Mycenaean Greeks. Over several centuries, numerous Ancient Greek city-states were established on the coasts of Anatolia. Greeks started Western philosophy on the western coast of Anatolia (Pre-Socratic philosophy).

Classical Anatolia
In Classical antiquity, Anatolia was described by the Ancient Greek historian Herodotus and later historians as divided into regions that were diverse in culture, language, and religious practices. The northern regions included Bithynia, Paphlagonia, and Pontus; to the west were Mysia, Lydia, and Caria; and Lycia, Pamphylia, and Cilicia belonged to the southern shore. There were also several inland regions: Phrygia, Cappadocia, Pisidia, and Galatia. Languages spoken included the late surviving Anatolic languages, Isaurian, and Pisidian, Greek in western and coastal regions, Phrygian spoken until the 7th century CE, local variants of Thracian in the northwest, the Galatian variant of Gaulish in Galatia until the 6th century CE, Cappadocian in the homonymous region, Armenian in the east, and Kartvelian languages in the northeast.

Anatolia is known as the birthplace of minted coinage (as opposed to unminted coinage, which first appears in Mesopotamia at a much earlier date) as a medium of exchange, some time in the 7th century BCE in Lydia. The use of minted coins continued to flourish during the Greek and Roman eras.

During the 6th century BCE, all of Anatolia was conquered by the Persian Achaemenid Empire, the Persians having usurped the Medes as the dominant dynasty of Persia. In 499 BCE, the Ionian city-states on the west coast of Anatolia rebelled against Persian rule. The Ionian Revolt, as it became known, though quelled, initiated the Greco-Persian Wars, which ended in a Greek victory in 449 BCE, and the Ionian cities regained their independence. By the Peace of Antalcidas (387 BCE), which ended the Corinthian War, Persia regained control over Ionia.

In 334 BCE, the Macedonian Greek king Alexander the Great conquered the Anatolian peninsula from the Achaemenid Persian Empire. Alexander's conquest opened up the interior of Asia Minor to Greek settlement and influence.
 Following the death of Alexander the Great and the subsequent breakup of the Macedonian Empire, Anatolia was ruled by a series of Hellenistic kingdoms, such as the Attalids of Pergamum and the Seleucids, the latter controlling most of Anatolia. A period of peaceful Hellenization followed, such that the local Anatolian languages had been supplanted by Greek by the 1st century BCE. In 133 BCE the last Attalid king bequeathed his kingdom to the Roman Republic; western and central Anatolia came under Roman control, but Hellenistic culture remained predominant.

Mithridates VI Eupator, ruler of the Kingdom of Pontus in northern Anatolia, waged war against the Roman Republic in the year 88 BCE in order to halt the advance of Roman hegemony in the Aegean Sea region. Mithridates VI sought to dominate Asia Minor and the Black Sea region, waging several hard-fought but ultimately unsuccessful wars (the Mithridatic Wars) to break Roman dominion over Asia and the Hellenic world. He has been called the greatest ruler of the Kingdom of Pontus. Further annexations by Rome, in particular of the Kingdom of Pontus by Pompey, brought all of Anatolia under Roman control, except for the southeastern frontier with the Parthian Empire, which remained unstable for centuries, causing a series of military conflicts that culminated in the Roman–Parthian Wars (54 BCE – 217 CE).

Early Christian Period

After the first division of the Roman Empire, Anatolia became part of the Eastern Roman Empire, otherwise known as the Byzantine Empire or Byzantium. In the 1st century CE, Anatolia became one of the first places where Christianity spread, so that by the 4th century CE, western and central Anatolia were overwhelmingly Christian and Greek-speaking.

Byzantine Anatolia was one of the wealthiest and most densely populated places in the Later Roman Empire. Anatolia's wealth grew during the 4th and 5th centuries thanks, in part, to the Pilgrim's Road that ran through the peninsula. Literary evidence about the rural landscape stems from the Christian hagiographies of the 6th-century Nicholas of Sion and 7th-century Theodore of Sykeon. Large and prosperous urban centers of Byzantine Anatolia included Assos, Ephesus, Miletus, Nicaea, Pergamum, Priene, Sardis, and Aphrodisias.

From the mid-5th century onwards, urbanism was affected negatively and began to decline, while the rural areas reached unprecedented levels of prosperity in the region. Historians and scholars continue to debate the cause of the urban decline in Byzantine Anatolia between the 6th and 7th centuries, variously attributing it to the Plague of Justinian (541), the Byzantine–Sasanian War (602–628), and the Arab invasion of the Levant (634–638).

Medieval Period

In the 10 years following the Battle of Manzikert in 1071, the Seljuk Turks from Central Asia migrated over large areas of Anatolia, with particular concentrations around the northwestern rim. The Turkish language and the Islamic religion were gradually introduced as a result of the Seljuk conquest, and this period marks the start of Anatolia's slow transition from predominantly Christian and Greek-speaking, to predominantly Muslim and Turkish-speaking (although ethnic groups such as Armenians, Greeks, and Assyrians remained numerous and retained Christianity and their native languages). In the following century, the Byzantines managed to reassert their control in western and northern Anatolia. Control of Anatolia was then split between the Byzantine Empire and the Seljuk Sultanate of Rûm, with the Byzantine holdings gradually being reduced.

In 1255, the Mongols swept through eastern and central Anatolia, and would remain until 1335. The Ilkhanate garrison was stationed near Ankara. After the decline of the Ilkhanate from 1335 to 1353, the Mongol Empire's legacy in the region was the Uyghur Eretna Dynasty that was overthrown by Kadi Burhan al-Din in 1381.

By the end of the 14th century, most of Anatolia was controlled by various Anatolian beyliks. Smyrna fell in 1330, and the last Byzantine stronghold in Anatolia, Philadelphia, fell in 1390. The Turkmen Beyliks were under the control of the Mongols, at least nominally, through declining Seljuk sultans. The Beyliks did not mint coins in the names of their own leaders while they remained under the suzerainty of the Mongol Ilkhanids. The Osmanli ruler Osman I was the first Turkish ruler who minted coins in his own name in 1320s; they bear the legend "Minted by Osman son of Ertugrul". Since the minting of coins was a prerogative accorded in Islamic practice only to a sovereign, it can be considered that the Osmanli, or Ottoman Turks, had become formally independent from the Mongol Khans.

Ottoman Empire

Among the Turkish leaders, the Ottomans emerged as great power under Osman I and his son Orhan I. The Anatolian beyliks were successively absorbed into the rising Ottoman Empire during the 15th century. It is not well understood how the Osmanlı, or Ottoman Turks, came to dominate their neighbours, as the history of medieval Anatolia is still little known. The Ottomans completed the conquest of the peninsula in 1517 with the taking of Halicarnassus (modern Bodrum) from the Knights of Saint John.

Modern times

With the acceleration of the decline of the Ottoman Empire in the early 19th century, and as a result of the expansionist policies of the Russian Empire in the Caucasus, many Muslim nations and groups in that region, mainly Circassians, Tatars, Azeris, Lezgis, Chechens and several Turkic groups left their homelands and settled in Anatolia. As the Ottoman Empire further shrank in the Balkan regions and then fragmented during the Balkan Wars, much of the non-Christian populations of its former possessions, mainly Balkan Muslims (Bosnian Muslims, Albanians, Turks, Muslim Bulgarians and Greek Muslims such as the Vallahades from Greek Macedonia), were resettled in various parts of Anatolia, mostly in formerly Christian villages throughout Anatolia.

A continuous reverse migration occurred since the early 19th century, when Greeks from Anatolia, Constantinople and Pontus area migrated toward the newly independent Kingdom of Greece, and also towards the United States, the southern part of the Russian Empire, Latin America, and the rest of Europe.

Following the Russo-Persian Treaty of Turkmenchay (1828) and the incorporation of Eastern Armenia into the Russian Empire, another migration involved the large Armenian population of Anatolia, which recorded significant migration rates from Western Armenia (Eastern Anatolia) toward the Russian Empire, especially toward its newly established Armenian provinces.

Anatolia remained multi-ethnic until the early 20th century (see the rise of nationalism under the Ottoman Empire). During World War I, the Armenian genocide, the Greek genocide (especially in Pontus), and the Assyrian genocide almost entirely removed the ancient indigenous communities of Armenian, Greek, and Assyrian populations in Anatolia and surrounding regions. Following the Greco-Turkish War of 1919–1922, most remaining ethnic Anatolian Greeks were forced out during the 1923 population exchange between Greece and Turkey. Of the remainder, most have left Turkey since then, leaving fewer than 5,000 Greeks in Anatolia today.

Geology

Anatolia's terrain is structurally complex. A central massif composed of uplifted blocks and downfolded troughs, covered by recent deposits and giving the appearance of a plateau with rough terrain, is wedged between two folded mountain ranges that converge in the east. True lowland is confined to a few narrow coastal strips along the Aegean, Mediterranean, and the Black Sea coasts. Flat or gently sloping land is rare and largely confined to the deltas of the Kızıl River, the coastal plains of Çukurova and the valley floors of the Gediz River and the Büyük Menderes River as well as some interior high plains in Anatolia, mainly around Lake Tuz (Salt Lake) and the Konya Basin (Konya Ovasi).

There are two mountain ranges in southern Anatolia: the Taurus and the Zagros mountains.

Climate

Anatolia has a varied range of climates. The central plateau is characterized by a continental climate, with hot summers and cold snowy winters. The south and west coasts enjoy a typical Mediterranean climate, with mild rainy winters, and warm dry summers. The Black Sea and Marmara coasts have a temperate oceanic climate, with cool foggy summers and much rainfall throughout the year.

Ecoregions

There is a diverse number of plant and animal communities.

The mountains and coastal plain of northern Anatolia experience a humid and mild climate. There are temperate broadleaf, mixed and coniferous forests. The central and eastern plateau, with its drier continental climate, has deciduous forests and forest steppes. Western and southern Anatolia, which have a Mediterranean climate, contain Mediterranean forests, woodlands, and scrub ecoregions.
 Euxine-Colchic deciduous forests: These temperate broadleaf and mixed forests extend across northern Anatolia, lying between the mountains of northern Anatolia and the Black Sea. They include the enclaves of temperate rainforest lying along the southeastern coast of the Black Sea in eastern Turkey and Georgia.
 Northern Anatolian conifer and deciduous forests: These forests occupy the mountains of northern Anatolia, running east and west between the coastal Euxine-Colchic forests and the drier, continental climate forests of central and eastern Anatolia.
 Central Anatolian deciduous forests: These forests of deciduous oaks and evergreen pines cover the plateau of central Anatolia.
 Central Anatolian steppe: These dry grasslands cover the drier valleys and surround the saline lakes of central Anatolia, and include halophytic (salt tolerant) plant communities.

 Eastern Anatolian deciduous forests: This ecoregion occupies the plateau of eastern Anatolia. The drier and more continental climate is beneficial for steppe-forests dominated by deciduous oaks, with areas of shrubland, montane forest, and valley forest.
 Anatolian conifer and deciduous mixed forests: These forests occupy the western, Mediterranean-climate portion of the Anatolian plateau. Pine forests and mixed pine and oak woodlands and shrublands are predominant.
 Aegean and Western Turkey sclerophyllous and mixed forests: These Mediterranean-climate forests occupy the coastal lowlands and valleys of western Anatolia bordering the Aegean Sea. The ecoregion has forests of Turkish pine (Pinus brutia), oak forests and woodlands, and maquis shrubland of Turkish pine and evergreen sclerophyllous trees and shrubs, including Olive (Olea europaea), Strawberry Tree (Arbutus unedo), Arbutus andrachne, Kermes Oak (Quercus coccifera), and Bay Laurel (Laurus nobilis).
 Southern Anatolian montane conifer and deciduous forests: These mountain forests occupy the Mediterranean-climate Taurus Mountains of southern Anatolia. Conifer forests are predominant, chiefly Anatolian black pine (Pinus nigra), Cedar of Lebanon (Cedrus libani), Taurus fir (Abies cilicica), and juniper (Juniperus foetidissima and J. excelsa). Broadleaf trees include oaks, hornbeam, and maples.
 Eastern Mediterranean conifer-sclerophyllous-broadleaf forests: This ecoregion occupies the coastal strip of southern Anatolia between the Taurus Mountains and the Mediterranean Sea. Plant communities include broadleaf sclerophyllous maquis shrublands, forests of Aleppo Pine (Pinus halepensis) and Turkish Pine (Pinus brutia), and dry oak (Quercus spp.) woodlands and steppes.

Demographics

The largest cities in Anatolia (aside from Ankara) are İzmir, Bursa, Antalya, Konya, Adana, İzmit, Mersin, Manisa, Kayseri, Samsun, Balıkesir, Kahramanmaraş, Aydın, Adapazarı, Denizli, Muğla, Eskişehir, Trabzon, Ordu, Afyonkarahisar, Sivas, Tokat, Zonguldak, Kütahya, Çanakkale, Osmaniye, Şırnak and Çorum. All have populations of more than 500,000.

See also

 Aeolis
 Anatolian hypothesis
 Anatolianism
 Anatolian leopard
 Anatolian Plate
 Anatolian Shepherd
 Ancient kingdoms of Anatolia
 Antigonid dynasty
 Doris (Asia Minor)
 Empire of Nicaea
 Empire of Trebizond
 Gordium
 Lycaonia
 Midas
 Miletus
 Myra
 Pentarchy
 Pontic Greeks
 Rumi
 Saint Anatolia
 Saint John
 Saint Nicholas
 Saint Paul
 Seleucid Empire
 Seven churches of Asia
 Seven Sleepers
 Tarsus
 Troad
 Turkic migration

Explanatory notes

References

Citations

General and cited sources

Further reading

Akat, Uücel, Neşe Özgünel, and Aynur Durukan. 1991. Anatolia: A World Heritage. Ankara: Kültür Bakanliǧi.
Brewster, Harry. 1993. Classical Anatolia: The Glory of Hellenism. London: I. B. Tauris.
Donbaz, Veysel, and Şemsi Güner. 1995. The Royal Roads of Anatolia. Istanbul: Dünya.
Dusinberre, Elspeth R. M. 2013. Empire, Authority, and Autonomy In Achaemenid Anatolia. Cambridge: Cambridge University Press.
Gates, Charles, Jacques Morin, and Thomas Zimmermann. 2009. Sacred Landscapes In Anatolia and Neighboring Regions. Oxford: Archaeopress.
Mikasa, Takahito, ed. 1999. Essays On Ancient Anatolia. Wiesbaden: Harrassowitz.
Takaoğlu, Turan. 2004. Ethnoarchaeological Investigations In Rural Anatolia. İstanbul: Ege Yayınları.
Taracha, Piotr. 2009. Religions of Second Millennium Anatolia. Wiesbaden: Harrassowitz.
Taymaz, Tuncay, Y. Yilmaz, and Yildirim Dilek. 2007. The Geodynamics of the Aegean and Anatolia. London: Geological Society.

External links
 

 
Ancient Greek geography
Ancient Near East
Eurasia
Geography of Armenia
Geography of Turkey
Geography of Western Asia
Geography of the Middle East
Historical regions
Near East
Peninsulas of Asia
Peninsulas of Turkey
Physiographic provinces
Regions of Asia
Regions of Turkey